"(There's Gotta Be) More to Life" is a song by American recording artist Stacie Orrico from her self-titled second studio album. The song was released as the album's second single in the United States in July 2003. "More to Life" was written by Sabelle Breer, Kevin Kadish, Lucy Woodward, Harvey Mason Jr. and Damon Thomas, and produced by the latter two as the Underdogs.

"(There's Gotta Be) More to Life" received generally positive reviews from music critics, with one of them calling it "strong". The song was also a commercial success, peaking within the top five in three countries, included New Zealand at number three, Norway at number two, and number five on the US Billboard Pop Songs chart.

Composition 

"(There's Gotta Be) More to Life" conveys a message about a person wanting more from their life. Writing for musicOMH, Bill Lehane observed that the track is "concerned with troubles of faith and gradually introduce [listeners] to the idea that this is, in fact, a record of deeply religious music."

Reception 

Jon Singer of PopMatters called the song a "strong" single.

Chart performance 

"(There's Gotta Be) More to Life" peaked at number 30 on the US Billboard Hot 100, becoming Orrico's biggest single to date in the country. The song also peaked at number 5 on the US Billboard Pop Songs, and number 31 on the US Billboard Adult Top 40.

The song also had received worldwide success. The song debuted at number 32 on the Australian singles chart, and after eight weeks in the charts, it peaked at number 11. It stayed in the charts for 19 weeks, and was certified Gold, selling over 35,000 copies in the country. The song debuted at number 48 on the New Zealand Singles Chart. After two weeks, the song jumped from number 38 to number 9, and after two weeks in the top 10, dropped to number 12; however, the next week, it re-entered the top 10, and after five weeks ascending the top 10, it reached its peak of number 3. It then stayed another two weeks in the top 10 before slowly dropping down the chart, staying 18 weeks total on the New Zealand chart. Half of those 18 weeks were spent in the top 10, and the song was certified Gold, selling over 7,500 copies there. The song also peaked at number 2 for four weeks in Norway and stayed on the country's chart for 16 weeks.

Music video 

The video is directed by Dave Meyers. Throughout the video, Orrico portrays a number of women with different yet hectic lives: a poor mother in debt, a member of a busking band, a long-distance marathon runner, a supermodel, a diner waitress, a businesswoman, a gang member, and a high-level thief.

The video ends with Orrico portrayed as a regular girl in a crowd, before finally disappearing as a passerby walks by.

Track listings 

US: CD

 "(There's Gotta Be) More to Life" (Album Version)
 "(There's Gotta Be) More to Life" (JN Radio Edit)
 "(There's Gotta Be) More to Life" (Global Soul Radio Edit)
 "(There's Gotta Be) More to Life" (Goodandevil/Ruff Ryders Remix)
 "(There's Gotta Be) More to Life" (Briss Remix)
 "(There's Gotta Be) More to Life" (Dr. Octavo Extended Mix)
 "(There's Gotta Be) More to Life" (Jason Nevins Club Creation)

US: DVD

 "(There's Gotta Be) More to Life" (Video)
 "(There's Gotta Be) More to Life" (Audio Remix)
 "Stuck" (Video)
 "Stuck" (Audio Remix)
 Behind the scenes
 Photo gallery

Europe: CD 1

 "(There's Gotta Be) More to Life"
 "Stuck" (Barry Harris & Chris Cox Remix)
 "Star of My Story"

UK: CD 1

 "(There's Gotta Be) More to Life" (Album Version)
 "Star of My Story"

UK: CD 2

 "(There's Gotta Be) More to Life" (Album Version)
 "(There's Gotta Be) More to Life" (Dr. Octavo Extended Mix)
 "Star of My Story"
 "(There's Gotta Be) More to Life" (Video)

Charts

Weekly charts

Year-end charts

Certifications

Release history

References 

2003 singles
2003 songs
ForeFront Records singles
Music videos directed by Dave Meyers (director)
Song recordings produced by the Underdogs (production team)
Songs containing the I–V-vi-IV progression
Songs written by Damon Thomas (record producer)
Songs written by Harvey Mason Jr.
Songs written by Kevin Kadish
Stacie Orrico songs
Virgin Records singles